The Society of Petroleum Evaluation Engineers (SPEE) is a non-profit professional organization with the objectives to promote the profession of petroleum evaluation engineering, to foster the spirit of scientific research among its Members, and to disseminate facts pertaining to petroleum evaluation engineering among its Members and the public.

External links 
 www.spee.org
 Journal of SPEE, 2008 Volume 2, has the history of the Society

Engineering societies based in the United States
Petroleum engineering
Organizations based in Houston